Jukka Sakari Wuolio (5 March 1927 in Tampere, Finland – 27 June 2001) was a professional ice hockey player who played in the SM-liiga.  He played for Ilves.  He was inducted into the Finnish Hockey Hall of Fame in 1985.

External links
 Finnish Hockey Hall of Fame bio

1927 births
2001 deaths
Ice hockey players at the 1952 Winter Olympics
Ilves players
Olympic ice hockey players of Finland
Ice hockey people from Tampere